Be in Belhaven was an annual music festival that was held in Scotland at Belhaven Park , situated in the town centre of Wishaw, North Lanarkshire.  The festival ran from 2008 to 2012 and the inaugural event was held on August 2, 2008. The festival was organized by the Be in Belhaven Planning Group, which was an amalgamation of various local volunteer groups, including Wishaw Patch Voice and Friends of Belhaven. The event was held as a charity fundraiser, with donations collected on the day of the festival going towards a chosen charitable cause. The primary beneficiary of the festival was Maggie's Cancer Centers, with a particular focus on supporting Maggie's Lanarkshire Interim service at University Hospital Wishaw.

2008

Planning 
In the Autumn of 2007, Friends of Belhaven, a Belhaven Park community group, approached Wishaw Patch Voice, a local youth group known locally for running music events, about providing live music for a family fun day. As one thing led to another, the family funday became a fully fledged music festival.

Event 

The event rook place on 2 August and was run as a Music Festival and a Family Funday. Along with the Main Stage there was also an Acoustic Tent run by the Foundry Music Lab, a Recording studio run by Wet Wet Wet guitarist Graeme Duffin. There was also many activities put on for young children in a bid to attract people along early in the day with the music becoming the main focus later in the day.
Headliners for the event were Glasgow girl band The Hedrons who, having already had chart success, was seen as a real coup. Negotiations with other chart acts The Holloways and The Rumble Strips had broken down. 34 other bands also played the event including tribute act, The Underground Jam and local bands such as Rocketfox, The Lafontaines, The Down & Outs, The Jackanoorys, Station Sound, The Seventeenth Century and Opportunity Club

The event turned out to be a much greater success than anticipated, attracting over 6000 people on the day and raising £2500 for Oxfam, making it the largest Oxjam ever at that point in time.

Additionally the event was seen a success by the local community and police force and heralded as a "modern take on the gala day". Despite there being a large number of people on site along with a licensed bar, there was no incidents in the park.

2009

Planning 

After the overwhelming success of the 2008 festival, there was demand to stage it as an annual event. Plans were put in place in late 2008 and the decision was made to keep the event in Belhaven Park despite the inevitable increase in size off the event.
At an early stage management of local establishment The Commercial Hotel got on board as a main sponsor of the event, handling the bars and catering.
Feedback suggested that the event be kept as to local bands thus keeping the community vibe, although 2008 favourites, The Underground Jam, were invited back to close the event. This led to auditions for the main stage being held with the hope of uncovering some hidden gems in the local community, one band that turned up chancing their luck actually opened the festival. The Foundry Music Lab ran a new stage while Aromas Cafe took over the acoustic tent.

Event 
Be in Belhaven 2009 took place on Saturday, 15 August. In addition to the music and funday events there was also a community learning village, fun fair attractions, Dance tent and a chainsaw carver.

Over 50 acts performed on 3 stages over the day, raising money for Oxfam and Maggies Centres. The acts included Still Vintage, The Underground Jam, The Lafontaines, Tempercalm, MakethisRelate, Dear Stars guitarist Stephen Archieblad's former band Midas, The Jackanoorys, Station Sound, Crossfire and Annie Stevenson. Wet Wet Wet guitarist Graeme Duffin made a special appearance in the Foundry Music Lab Arena alongside JJ Gilmour, of The Silencers fame. The event was once again more successful than anticipated as over 10,000 people and went on to raise around £6000 for charity.

2010

Planning 
Be in Belhaven returned for a third year in 2010 on 7 August. Maggies Cancer Centres became the sole beneficiary of the event for the first time. The practical side of the event didn't vary much from the 2009 event other than a bigger bar area and a much larger main stage.

Event 
Even more acts than before performed at the event, this time around 65. Among these acts were headliners The Beatles, a Beatles tribute act, local heroes Crossfire, Leeds boys The Stella Frays, The Lafontaines, MakethisRelate, Twisted RainBow and Vigo Thieves.Wet Wet Wet guitarist Graeme Duffin made a special appearance in the Foundry Music Lab Arena playing with family members under the guise of The Duffins. The event was regarded as a success as around 10,000 people attended the event on the day.

2011

Planning 
After three successful years, Be in Belhaven returns to cement its place as North Lanarkshire's biggest annual festival. The event is due to take place on Saturday 13 August.

2012 

The same fair event is on Saturday 11 August 2012.

Funding, partners & charities 
Funding for the events has been provided by multiple sources including North Lanarkshire Council, The Big Lottery Fund and Municipal Bank.

Official partners 
Magnum Sound 2008 - present
Foundry Music Lab 2008 - present
North Lanarkshire Council 2008 - present
The Commercial Hotel 2009 - present

Charities 
Oxfam 2008 - 2009
Maggies 2009 - present

References

Music festivals in Scotland
2008 establishments in Scotland
Wishaw
Electronic music festivals in the United Kingdom